The 2002–03 OHL season was the 23rd season of the Ontario Hockey League. The North Bay Centennials relocated to Saginaw, Michigan, becoming the Saginaw Spirit. Due to the move, several teams changed divisions; the Saginaw Spirit were placed in the west division, the London Knights moved to the midwest division, and the Brampton Battalion moved to the central division. The London Knights moved into the new John Labatt Centre, which replaced the London Ice House. The Tim Adams Memorial Trophy was inaugurated as the MVP of the OHL Cup. Twenty teams each played 68 games. The Mississauga Icedogs qualified for the playoffs for the first time in their existence. The Kitchener Rangers won the J. Ross Robertson Cup, defeating the Ottawa 67's in the final.

Regular season

Final standings
Note: DIV = Division; GP = Games played; W = Wins; L = Losses; T = Ties; OTL = Overtime losses; GF = Goals for; GA = Goals against; PTS = Points; x = clinched playoff berth; y = clinched division title; z = clinched conference title

Eastern conference

Western conference

Scoring leaders

Playoffs

Conference quarterfinals

Eastern conference

Western conference

Conference semifinals

Conference finals

J. Ross Robertson Cup finals

J. Ross Robertson Cup Champions Roster

All-Star teams

First team
Corey Locke, Centre, Ottawa 67's
Cody McCormick, Left Wing, Belleville Bulls
Matt Foy, Right Wing, Ottawa 67's
Brendan Bell, Defence, Ottawa 67's
Lukas Krajicek, Defence, Peterborough Petes
Andy Chiodo, Goaltender, Toronto St. Michael's Majors
Brian Kilrea, Coach, Ottawa 67's

Second team
Eric Staal, Centre, Peterborough Petes
Brandon Nolan, Left Wing, Oshawa Generals
Chad LaRose, Right Wing, Plymouth Whalers
Steve Eminger, Defence, Kitchener Rangers
Carlo Colaiacovo, Defence, Erie Otters
Chris Houle, Goaltender, London Knights
Jim Hulton, Coach, Belleville Bulls

Third team
Matt Stajan, Centre, Belleville Bulls
Kris Newbury, Left Wing, Sarnia Sting
Dustin Brown, Right Wing, Guelph Storm
Trevor Daley, Defence, Sault Ste. Marie Greyhounds
Tim Gleason, Defence, Windsor Spitfires
Michael Mole, Goaltender, Belleville Bulls
Peter DeBoer, Coach, Kitchener Rangers

Awards

2003 OHL Priority Selection
On May 3, 2003, the OHL conducted the 2003 Ontario Hockey League Priority Selection. The Saginaw Spirit held the first overall pick in the draft, and selected Patrick McNeill from the Strathroy Rockets. McNeill was awarded the Jack Ferguson Award, awarded to the top pick in the draft.

Below are the players who were selected in the first round of the 2003 Ontario Hockey League Priority Selection.

2003 CHL Import Draft
On June 26, 2003, the Canadian Hockey League conducted the 2003 CHL Import Draft, in which teams in all three CHL leagues participate in. The Owen Sound Attack held the first pick in the draft by a team in the OHL, and selected Štefan Ružička from Slovakia with their selection.

Below are the players who were selected in the first round by Ontario Hockey League teams in the 2003 CHL Import Draft.

See also
List of OHA Junior A standings
List of OHL seasons
2003 Memorial Cup
2003 NHL Entry Draft
2002 in sports
2003 in sports

References

HockeyDB

Ontario Hockey League seasons
OHL